The 1970 Chatham Cup was the 43rd annual nationwide knockout football competition in New Zealand.

Early stages of the competition were run on a regional basis, however the structure of the competition was altered from previous years, largely due to the commencement of the New Zealand National Soccer League. Whereas in previous years qualification matches had been entirely run on a by-region basis culminating in two finals, one in each island, the draw from 1970 became more open, with regional qualifiers facing National League opposition in the final rounds. This led to several firsts for the competition, with Nelson United becoming the first South Island team to play a (pre-final) Chatham Cup match in the North Island, Western Suburbs FC becoming the first North Island team to play in Christchurch, and Stop Out being the first North Island team to play in Dunedin. Caversham was the only regional qualifier to make it as far as the semi-finals in the National League's first year, beating two league teams (Christchurch United and Stop Out) in the process.

A further boost was given to the competition though Gillette, who became the Chatham Cup's first naming-rights sponsors. The competition was to be known as the Gillette Chatham Cup until 1974, when Lion Breweries took over sponsorship of the competition.

In all, 105 teams took part in the competition, with the eight National League teams being joined with a further 67 North Island and 30 South Island teams. In the National League's inaugural season, Blockhouse Bay became the first team to win the league and cup double. Note: Different sources give different numberings for the rounds of the competition: some start round one with the beginning of the regional qualifications; others start numbering from the first national knock-out stage. The former numbering scheme is used in this article.

The 1970 final
The final was the first all-North Island final, and was also the first final to require a replay. The replay was held in Auckland, making this first Chatham Cup final to be decided outside Wellington, and the first not to be decided at the Basin Reserve since 1927. The first match was memorable, and pitted favourites against underdogs. The two teams had both been in the first season of the national league, with Blockhouse Bay emerging as clear champions and Western Suburbs propping up the foot of the table with just one win from 14 league matches. It was the underdogs who had the makings of the trophy, however, leading by two Wayne Huntley goals with only a handful of minutes remaining. Between the 83rd and 86th minutes, however, Colin Shaw hit the target twice for the Bay, the second of the goals coming from a penalty which had to be retaken. Bay dominated the two periods of extra time, yet it was Suburbs who came closest to gaining the upper hand, hitting the woodwork on two occasions. The old rule of counting corners to decide the outcome of a tie had been scrapped and the idea of a penalty shootout had not yet been introduced, so the match headed to a replay.

The rematch was a seesaw affair, with Bay leading twice only for Suburbs to equalise each time. With minutes remaining, Suburbs found what looked like the winning strike, but it was ruled out for offside. With seconds to go, it was Blockhouse Bay who finally tipped the scales. Goals in the match came from Clive Campbell, Ian Ormond and Colin Shaw for the Bay and Bruce Baker and Barry Humphreys for Suburbs.

Results

Third Round

* Won by Invercargill United on corners

Fourth Round

Fifth Round

Sixth Round

Quarter-finals

* Blockhouse Bay won on corners

Semi-finals

Final

Replay

References

Rec.Sport.Soccer Statistics Foundation New Zealand 1970 page
UltimateNZSoccer website 1970 Chatham Cup page

Chatham Cup
Chatham Cup
Chatham Cup
September 1970 sports events in New Zealand